The Negev Foundation is a Cleveland, Ohio, based non-profit, tax-exempt organization that promotes the agricultural development and economic sustainability of the Negev Desert in Israel.

The Foundation

The Negev Foundation promotes agricultural innovations that allow farmers to utilize the desert's arid lands and brackish water as tools to successfully cultivate a wide range of crops. In 2008, the organization was recognized by Charity Navigator for its fourth consecutive year of having a four star C.N. efficiency rating.

Notable projects

The Ohio-Israel Agriculture Initiative of the Negev Foundation

Since 2002, The Negev Foundation has overseen the Ohio-Israel Agriculture Initiative. This initiative has coordinated and developed projects engaging both the Ohio and Israel agricultural industries in the areas of trade, exhibition, research and development projects. For example, students from Hocking College in Nelsonville, Ohio received funded internships from the initiative to gain work experience at fish farms in Israel. The Initiative has also funded research projects including one where Israeli cattle were inseminated by bull semen from Ohio to evaluate breed quality and innovative artificial insemination processes.

The Ramat Negev AgroResearch Center and George V. and Janet Voinovich Business Center

In a long-term effort to conquer the challenges of achieving sustainability in the desert, The Negev Foundation secured funding for permanent research facilities and a unique, regional business center. The foundation inaugurated the  combined research and business center in December 2007. The George V. and Janet Voinovich Business Center is named for the U.S. senator and his wife as a tribute to their work and friendship with Israel. The Foundation also supports the Ramat Negev AgroResearch Center where researchers seek to develop innovations to improve desert agricultural tools and techniques.

See also 
Agriculture in Israel
Agricultural Research in Israel
The Negev

References

External links 
 The Negev Foundation
 The Ohio Israeli Agriculture Initiative
 Ramat Negev Regional Council News
 Ramat Negev Desert AgroResearch

Non-profit organizations based in Ohio